Sthenias pascoei is a species of beetle in the family Cerambycidae. It was described by Ritsema in 1888. It is known from Sumatra and Malaysia.

References

pascoei
Beetles described in 1888